Dawu is a town in the Okere District Eastern Region of Ghana. It shares border with Abiriw and Awukugua

Festival 
The People of Dawu celebrate Ohum and this ceremony is usually held in December/January. Ohum is one of Ghana's many festivals that see attendance from people from all walks of life including the diaspora.

The Ohum festival is celebrated to mark the beginning of harvesting new farm crops, just like the Homowo of the Gas, Ahoboa and Bakatue of the Ahantas, and Aboakyere of the Awutus and Afutus, Kundum of the Fantes, Adaekese of the Ashantis, Hogbotsotso of Anlo (Ewes), Dambaa of the Dagombas, and Appoo of Brong-Ahafo.

Ohumwas an ancient traditional festival of the people of Akuapem, particularly the Larteh and Okere people including Abiriw who are Guans.

Notable places and people
Dreams FC
Dawu Sports Stadium

References

Populated places in the Eastern Region (Ghana)